The Huachihuanhe Formation is a geologic formation in China. It is Early Cretaceous, probably Hauterivian, in age. The Pterosaur Huanhepterus has been recovered from the formation.

See also

 List of pterosaur-bearing stratigraphic units

Footnotes

References

Hauterivian Stage
Lower Cretaceous Series of Asia